This is a list of current Municipalities of Denmark. The number of municipalities was reduced from 270 to the current 98 on Monday January 1, 2007. The archipelago of Ertholmene is not part of any municipality or region but is administered by the Ministry of Defence. Area of municipalities includes water, which can make up a significant part of the total area of a municipality, i.e. Furesø and Halsnæs.

 Used for various statistical and administrative purposes.

See also
 Municipalities of Denmark
 List of municipalities of Denmark (1970–2006)
 List of urban areas in Denmark by population
 List of the most populated municipalities in the Nordic countries

External links

Populations as of 2012-01-01 
Areas in sq.km 
Eniro map with 98 named municipalities 
Printable map of  municipalities (Krak) 
Maps (pdf) of local Government administration 1660-2007.Vælg et årstal:Select a year 
Ministry of the Interior and Health:Structural reform with report from the Commission on Administrative Structure etc.

Denmark, Municipalities of
Municipalities
Municipalities